Santero (feminine form santera, Spanish for "saint-maker") may refer to:

 An artisan who creates  and other Spanish-style religious artwork
 A priest in the Santería, religion
 Santera Tequila, a brand of tequila